is a Japanese manga series written and illustrated by Hiroya Oku. There are two separate series of Hen, but they share the same setting, and characters from the first series appear in the second. They both were serialized in Shueisha's seinen manga magazine Weekly Young Jump.

Plot

Suzuki and Satō
(変) Suzuki and Satō: The first series, 13 volumes—Ichirō Suzuki, a straight young man who becomes besotted with another guy, Yūki Sato, convinced his bishōnen love is a girl trapped in a boy's body. The first three volumes of this series collect Oku's early short stories, including prototype versions of both Hen series.

Chizuru and Azumi
(HEN) Chizuru and Azumi: The second series, 8 volumes—Sexy student Chizuru Yoshida, to her utmost horror, falls in love with another girl, the innocent Azumi Yamada. A prototype version of this story was published in 変(Hen)#2.

Characters
 
 , Live-action: Asami Jō
 A beautiful and perfect high school student who excels in everything she does, Chizuru is every man's dream and she knows it. A promiscuous and very sexually active person who plays men for whatever she wants, the young model has a great life until she meets her current fling's new neighbors. Instantly Chizuru, a girl who has never known love, falls heavily for the young female neighbor, Azumi Yamada. Chizuru, refusing to admit it at first, quickly comes to realize she must be with Azumi at any cost. Now living with her fake boyfriend, Hiroyuki, just one apartment away from Azumi, she puts forth every effort to constantly be around her crush. She has an interesting physique compared to other female characters; although she is slender, she has large breasts in contrast to the rest of her willowy figure. The English dub portrays Chizuru as an older teenage college student whereas in the Japanese version she is in high school and around 16 to 17 years old.
 
 , Live-action: Miho Kiuchi
 Azumi is an innocent and average looking high school student. However, after moving from Kyushu to a new city and new apartment complex she meets Chizuru. At first the friendly Azumi tries to be nice to Chizuru, only to be harshly rejected. Eventually though, the two become friends, although Azumi fears that there might be something weird about Chizuru. Azumi, who wishes to become a screenwriter, one day attempts to join the drama club. There she befriends a young, amateur film maker named Ryuichi Kobayashi.
 
 Live-action: Yosuke Kubozuka
 Ryuichi is also a newly transferred high school student who enjoys making movies in his free time. Upon meeting Chizuru in the infirmary, he quickly falls in love with her face, wishing for her to be an actress in one of his movies. Ryuichi eventually befriends Azumi as they attempt to join the drama club. As evidenced from chapter 38 he has an enormous penis.
 
 , Live-action: Hiroki Okayasu
 Karasawa, who appears as the main character for several of the opening chapters, is a new teacher at Momoyuri College (high school in the Japanese version), the same school Chizuru and Azumi attend. He quickly falls in love with Chizuru after recognizing her as a model. After a little effort, Karasawa is able to trick Chizuru into admitting she is a model, infuriating her. She then convinces Karasawa to let her sleep at his apartment for the night, where she enacts vengeance through teasing him to some degree or another throughout the night.  His name is written with the same kanji as Toshiaki Karasawa.
 
 , Live-action: Shinsuke Aoki
 A young Japanese rock star, living in his parents' mansion (a large Japanese apartment considered to be more like a suite) and on their money, he was yet another fling of the beautiful Chizuru. However, when his new neighbors moved in with their daughter Azumi Yamada, Chizuru quickly claimed him as her boyfriend. Hiroyuki, realizing that Chizuru has a crush on Azumi, but truly believing that she loves him, has formed a plan to seduce and sleep with Azumi, ruining her for Chizuru.

Media

Manga
Written and illustrated by Hiroya Oku, the prototype of Hen was selected as a semi-finalist at the 19th Youth Manga Awards in 1988. The manga started its serialization in Shueisha's seinen manga magazine Weekly Young Jump in 1989. Shueisha collected its chapters in thirteen tankōbon volumes, released from April 25, 1991, to April 24, 1995; a four-volume shinsoban edition was published from October 19, 2000, to January 19, 2001.

Another series, also titled Hen (stylized in Latin script), started in the same magazine in 1992. Shueisha collected its chapters in eight tankōbon volumes, released from September 24, 1995, to June 24, 1997.

Drama
In 1996, Hen was adapted into a  Japanese television drama. The first half starred Shinsuke Aoki as Suzuki, actress Aiko Sato as Sato, and Shigaya Kazuma as Hiroya Oku. The second half starred Asami Jo as Chizuru and Miho Kiuchi as Azumi. The VHS release had more explicit sex scenes than the broadcast version. The TV version was released on Region 2 DVD in November 2006.

Cast

Played by Shinsuke Aoki
(Not to be confused with Ichiro Suzuki)

Played by Aiko Sato

Played by Kazuma Shigaya

Played by Hideki Okada

Played by Juri Miyazawa

Played by Miho Kiuchi

Played by Tomoka Kurotani

Original video animation
In 1997, the "Chizuru and Azumi" series was adapted into a two-episode original video animation series. It was released in North America by Central Park Media under the title Strange Love.

References

External links
  (live action)
  (anime)
 

1990s LGBT literature
1990s LGBT-related drama television series
1996 Japanese television series debuts
1997 anime OVAs
Central Park Media
Group TAC
Japanese LGBT-related television shows
Japanese television dramas based on manga
LGBT in anime and manga
Romantic comedy anime and manga
Seinen manga
Shueisha franchises
Shueisha manga
TV Asahi original programming
Yuri (genre) anime and manga